Teutoniella is a genus of spiders in the family Anapidae. It was first described in 1981 by Brignoli. , it contains 2 species.

References

Anapidae
Araneomorphae genera
Spiders of South America